Mystery Submarine is a 1950 American war film directed by Douglas Sirk and starring Macdonald Carey, Märta Torén and Robert Douglas.

Plot
Madeline Brenner, a German naturalized as an American, is being questioned by the United States Attorney for the Southern District of New York, who is considering treason charges against her.

In flashback, she describes how she worked on Cape Cod as a secretary for a wealthy woman, Mrs. Weber. Madeline believes her husband died five years earlier, in 1945, when his U-boat, the U-64, was sunk. She is approached by a mysterious man on the beach, who says her husband is still alive. He says she can be reunited with him if she helps kidnap Dr. Gurnitz, a noted German scientist visiting Mrs. Weber. During a yacht cruise the next day, Madeline disables the radio as the U-64 surfaces. The submarine’s crew kidnaps Gurnitz. Onboard the U-64, Madeline discovers she has been lied to. Her husband is dead, although his submarine survived. The man from the beach, Eric von Molter, is now in command, and used her to get Gurnitz. Von Molter sinks the yacht, killing Mrs. Weber and the passengers and crew.

Captain Elliott and Doctor Brett Young next give testimony. Elliot describes how the Navy figured out the yacht was sunk by a German torpedo and learned the renegade submarine might be operating out of a secret base near the fictional town of Belgrana in an unnamed South American country. They sent Young, one of their best spies, to investigate.

Young describes how he searched the coast, discovering the cove where the U-64 was hiding. Young is caught, but von Molter buys Young’s cover story, that he is a German submariner who escaped an American POW camp. Von Molter invites Young to be their medic, tending to Gurnitz. Madeline feels she’s a prisoner on von Molter’s estate, but he is determined to win her heart. Von Molter plans to trade Gurnitz on the high seas in a few days’ time. Young attempts to use the U-64’s radio to warn his superiors, but von Molter catches him before he can send a message. Madeline attempts to escape the estate, but Young stops her, saying she will never get out alive. Young tells von Molter he needs medication for Gurnitz and wants to go to Belgrana on his own for it, hoping to radio for help, but von Molter says they will leave early on the U-64 and stop for medicine in Belgrana on the way. In Belgrana, Young successfully slips a note to a nurse at the clinic, but von Molter shoots the nurse so there will be no witnesses and finds the note.

At sea, a US Navy ship discovers the U-64. Von Molter takes evasive action, but Madeline risks her life to fire a flare, revealing their location, as Young instructed her to do. The US ships fire depth charges. Von Molter shoots debris out the torpedo tube, to make the Americans think they have sunk the submarine. Among the items is a lifejacket, on which Young wrote the coordinates of the planned meeting at sea, where Gurnitz will be handed over. The Americans continue firing depth charges, so von Molter risks everything, taking the U-64 below the maximum safe depth to successfully hide.

When the U-64 reaches the meeting point at sea, Von Molter takes Gurnitz over to the other ship, along with Young and Madeline, who are to be killed. As von Molter unwraps his payment, it is revealed to be the life preserver with the location written on it by Young. US Navy men appear, revealing they laid a trap. Von Molter says his submarine has orders to fire on the ship if he is not back in ten minutes. The Navy refuses to allow him to return, so everyone waits a few tense minutes until, just as the U-64 prepares to fire, a squadron of US military planes appears, bombing the U-64, and saving the day.

Back in the present, Young argues to the U.S. Attorney that Madeline risked her life to save them all and should not be charged with treason. The U.S. Attorney agrees, allowing Young and Madeline to walk off together, arm in arm.

Cast
 Macdonald Carey as Doctor Brett Young
 Märta Torén as Madeline Brenner
 Robert Douglas as Commander Eric von Molter
 Carl Esmond as Heldman 
 Ludwig Donath as Dr. Adolph Guernitz 
 Jacqueline Dalya as Carla (as Jacqueline Dalya Hilliard)
 Fred Nurney as Bruno
 Katherine Warren as Mrs. Weber (as Katherline Warren)
 Howard Negley as Captain Elliott
 Bruce Morgan as Kramer
 Ralph Brooks as Stefan (as Ralph Brooke)
 Paul Hoffman as Hartwig
 Peter Michael as Crew Member 
 Larry Winter as Crew Member
 Frank Rawls as Crew Member 
 Peter Similuk as Crew Member

References

External links

1950 films
1950 war films
American spy films
Films directed by Douglas Sirk
Films set in South America
Submarine films
1950s thriller films
Universal Pictures films
American war films
American black-and-white films
1950s English-language films
1950s American films